Ilias Tsiligiris (born 3 October 1987) is a Greek professional footballer who plays as a winger for Super League 2 club Egaleo, for which he is captain.

Career
On 16 July 2014, Tsiligiris signed for AEL, but he was released from the club on 23 December 2014. On 8 January 2015, he signed a 1.5 year contract with Greek Football League club Iraklis.

References

External links
Myplayer

1987 births
Living people
Apollon Smyrnis F.C. players
Iraklis Thessaloniki F.C. players
Athlitiki Enosi Larissa F.C. players
Thrasyvoulos F.C. players
Association football wingers
Footballers from Athens
Greek footballers